Lee Da-hye (born April 5, 1987) is a South Korean swimmer, who specialized in backstroke events. Lee qualified for the women's 200 m backstroke at the 2004 Summer Olympics in Athens, by clearing a FINA B-standard entry time of 2:14.88 from the Dong-A Swimming Tournament in Seoul. She challenged seven other swimmers in heat two, including top medal favorite Evelyn Verrasztó of Hungary. She edged out Guatemala's Gisela Morales to claim a fifth spot by half a second in 2:17.73. Lee failed to advance into the semifinals, as she placed twenty-fifth overall in the preliminaries.

References

1987 births
Living people
South Korean female backstroke swimmers
Olympic swimmers of South Korea
Swimmers at the 2004 Summer Olympics
21st-century South Korean women